Copse Lock is a lock on the Kennet and Avon Canal, between Kintbury and Newbury, Berkshire, England.

The lock has a rise/fall of 6 ft 0 in (1.82 m).

See also

Locks on the Kennet and Avon Canal

References

Locks on the Kennet and Avon Canal
Locks of Berkshire
Hamstead Marshall